Clover Creek or Clovercreek may refer to:

Clover Creek (Bruneau River tributary), a stream in Owyhee County, Idaho
Clover Creek (Pennsylvania), a tributary of the Frankstown Branch Juniata River
Fredericksburg, Blair County, Pennsylvania, also known as Clover Creek, a town on the above stream
Clover Creek, Virginia, an unincorporated community
Clover Creek, Washington, an unincorporated community
Clover Creek (Washington), a creek in Pierce County